Bruno Alberto Langa (born 31 October 1997) is a Mozambican professional footballer who plays as a left-back for Chaves and the Mozambique national team.

Career
Langa began his senior career in Mozambique, with Maxaquene and Black Bulls. In 2017, he moved to the Portuguese club Amora in the Campeonato de Portugal, before joining Vitória Setúbal on loan in 2019-20 in the Primeira Liga. He transferred to Chaves in the Liga Portugal 2 on 23 June 2021. He made his professional debut with Chaves in a 2–1 Taça da Liga loss to Farense on 24 July 2021. He helped them get promoted into the Primeira Liga, as they were promoted via playoffs as the season ended.

International career
Langa represented the Mozambique U20s at the 2016 COSAFA U-20 Cup. He made his debut with the senior Mozambique national team in a 3–0 2016 COSAFA Cup loss to Namibia on 21 June 2016.

References

External links
 
 
 

1997 births
Living people
Sportspeople from Maputo
Mozambican footballers
Mozambique international footballers
Mozambique youth international footballers
Association football fullbacks
C.D. Maxaquene players
Amora F.C. players
Vitória F.C. players
G.D. Chaves players
Liga Portugal 2 players
Campeonato de Portugal (league) players
Moçambola players
Mozambican expatriate footballers
Mozambican expatriates in Portugal
Expatriate footballers in Portugal